Ancient Arts of Central Asia is a 1965 illustrated monograph by Russian-born English art historian Tamara Talbot Rice, published by Thames & Hudson as part of their 'World of Art Library' series.

Synopsis 
Under the name of Central Asia, Tamara Talbot Rice covers in the book a vast region in the broader interpretation of the term, from Transcaucasia to Eastern Turkestan, and a period spanning from prehistoric times to the Middle Ages when Christianity and Islam replaced Buddhism and Zoroastrianism.

Starting with the early animal art of the Scythians in Southern Russia, the author proceeds eastwards, through Urartu and Persian-influenced region (Marlik and Ziwieh), Sogdia and Chorasmia, Hellenistic Bactria to Indo-Greek art, revealing the Graeco-Buddhist sculpture of Gandhara and the more Indian-natured School of Mathura. In the fifth chapter, Rice examines the little-known paintings and other forms of art of Eastern Turkestan, including Buddhist art of Bezeklik, Kizil, Khotan and Tunhuang, Indo-Sassanian influenced art unearthed in Dandan Oilik, East Syriac Christian and Manichaean murals discovered in Karakhoja (also Koço or Qocho), she also touches on the subject of Tibetan art. In the last chapter the author returns to the west to give an account of the early Christian art of Armenia, Georgia and Caucasian Albania.

Contents 

 Introduction;
 Chapter One: "The World of the Transcaucasian and Central Asian Nomads";
 Chapter Two: "The smaller kingdoms of Transcaucasia and the Persian highlands during the first millennium ʙᴄ";
 Chapter Three: "Soghdia, Ferghana and Chorasmia from Achaemenid to Islamic times";
 Chapter Four: "Bactria and North-Western India from Achaemenid to Islamic times";
 Chapter Five: "Eastern Turkestan in the Roman and Buddhist Periods";
 Chapter Six: "Armenia, Georgia and Caucasian Albania in Early Christian times";
 Bibliography;
 Maps;
 Chronology of Ancient Orient, Greater Caucasian Area, Russian Central Asia, Afghanistan, India and Eastern Turkestan from 3000 BC to 1000 AD;
 List of Illustrations;
 Index;

Reception 
The illustrations in Ancient Arts of Central Asia received positive reviews from academic critics, while the text has been strongly criticised.

In his review for Bulletin of the School of Oriental & African Studies, the British archaeologist David Bivar wrote: 'The illustrations bring together a valuable range of photographs, many previously available to the Western reader only in out-of-the-way Soviet publications. The quality of reproduction both in the 205 half-tone illustrations and the 47 in colour is very creditable, and represents good value at the price. In her text the author places the illustrations in their historical context, and discusses the various threads of influence which link one artistic school with another.'

The Canadian literary critic George Woodcock also gave the chosen illustrations a positive review, but severely criticised the text: 'The reader will be impressed by the haunting unity which the magnificently chose illustrations evoke, and by the way in which a group of minor schools of art, each influenced by greater traditions at the point of decay (Hellenic, Achaemenian, Byzantine, Indian) and each producing a relatively small number of masterpieces, can emerge when displayed together as a definable Eurasian tradition. [...] Good and abundant as the illustrations are, much is lost by the inexcusable deficiencies of the text. The lesser of these deficiencies is to be found in the discrepancy one often encounters between captions to prints and descriptions of the illustrated items in the text. A Sassanian dish is dated in a caption 3rd century BC and in the text, accurately, 3rd century AD. [...] Even the text does not escape gross inaccuracies. We find, for example, a puzzling reference to "the rulers of the Gupta Valley" (meaning the Gupta emperors); [...] suggestions, which have utterly no support in historical evidence, such as that the Seleucids ruled in Gandhara and Menander in Turkestan. [...] It is unpardonable that a writer with Mrs. Rice's reputation should impose on the public so shoddy and careless a text.'

Lorenz S. Leshnik of Central Asiatic Journal felt that the book is 'well-illustrated', but a 'hurriedly written product', and 'the shortcomings of this volume must give cause for concern'. 'Inaccuracies abound', such as 'St. Thomas (18–72 AD) is believed to have visited Azes I (reigned circa 48/47–25 BC)', 'the dynasty of Gondophares (incorrectly written "Gondolphus") was overthrown by the Kushans in about 64 AD, who then established close contacts with Augustan Rome (Augustus died in 14 AD)', 'it is thought that Mani lived and studied at Bamyan' instead of India, just to name a few. Leshnik concluded at the end of his review: 'In general, there is too much concern with origins and influences and the descriptive comments are unconvincing. [...] In a book for the layman, the names of authorities, to whom reference is occasionally made, should have been introduced with some sort of identifying remark.'

Richard N. Frye, American scholar of Central Asian studies, expressed strong disapproval of Rice's work, writing: 'Does she have to write such books in the series "The World of Art Library" in a hurry to please the publisher? There is nothing new in the book under review, many errors, and some nice pictures; for whom is the book written? [...] I cannot recommend this book, nor is there much point in continuing this review. It was obviously written in haste and should be so read.'

International editions

See also 

 Azerbaijani art
 Kushan art
 Manichaean art
 Serindian art
 Sogdian art
 Sogdian Daēnās
 Sampul tapestry
 Viśa Īrasangä
 Murals from the Christian temple at Qocho
 Painting of a Nestorian Christian figure

References

Further reading

External links 
 

1965 non-fiction books
Art history books
Books about Central Asia
English non-fiction books
English-language books
Illustrated books
Ancient Central Asian art
Thames & Hudson books